Adi Kapyare Kootamani ( is a 2015 Indian Malayalam comedy horror film co-written and directed by John Varghese  and starring Dhyan Sreenivasan, Namitha Pramod, Mukesh, Aju Varghese, Neeraj Madhav, Vineeth Mohan and Bijukuttan. The film was jointly produced by Sandra Thomas and Vijay Babu under the banner of Friday Film House and Carnival Motion Pictures. Shaan Rahman has composed the soundtrack and background score for the film. The film was released theatrically on 25 December 2015.

Plot
The movie starts with the introduction of Father Alfred Kattuvilayil (Mukesh) who considers himself to be a very strict warden of a college boys hostel. His assistant Shaanthappan (Bijukuttan) always tries to show him the mischief of the students but always fails. Adhishta Lakshmi (Namitha Pramod) fights with her father (John Vijay) over her boyfriend and on the next day meets Bhanuprasad (Dhyan Sreenivasan) in the canteen of his college. Bhanu has lost his gold chain by lending it for his friend Harris (Bhagath Manuel). As he wanted money, Lakshmi offers the amount of rupees 20,000 for taking her to his hostel for some unknown reason on that night.

That night Bhanu smuggles Lakshmi into the hostel, but by the time he tries to get her out, the way out was blocked. That night both stay in Bhanu's room. Not fully trusting Bhanu, Lakshmi ties Bhanu to a table and sets alarm on his phone for 3 AM. But both sleep off as it is like a lullaby song and wake up only by eight, when Bhanu's friend Koshy (Vineeth Mohan) and Bruno (Aju Varghese) knocks his door. Bhanu skips college and tries to get her out. But the escape route was blocked by Father and Shanthappan. He tries to get her out through the Main entrance but to his horror, the college was closed for strike as her father had beaten an auto rickshaw driver because he had dropped her in front of the hostel thinking that she (Adishta Lakshmi) escaped with his help. So the students came back to the hostel.

Both stays in Bhanu's room for the whole day planning to escape from the terrace that night. When Bhanu goes to the terrace to check, he sees a number of students including his friends Bruno (Aju Varghese), Koshy (Vineeth Mohan) and Remo (Neeraj Madhav) boozing. They force him to drink and he forgets about Lakshmi locked in his room. When Shanthappan goes near Bhanu's room after sometime, he hears Lakshmi speaking in her sleep in Tamil. He thinks that it is a ghost and get the key from Bhanu's pocket and opens the door. Lakshmi kicks him and run out of the room, and Shanthappan is knocked out. Next day Bhanu wake up and Father is persuaded by Shanthappan to check Bhanu's room for the ghost. Bhanu opens the room reluctantly and is surprised not to see Lakshmi. He then finds out that his friends found out about Lakshmi and they together plan to get her out. Lakshmi then tells them the reason why she came into the hostel. She had a lover Premraj (Roshan Mathew) who was a Casanova, stayed in the hostel, and after he broke up with her she wanted to take revenge. So she went to his room and slapped him. Bhanu, Bruno and Koshy while planning to get her out, are irritated by Remo's behavior as he constantly tries to flirt with Lakshmi.

That day night when they try to get her out from the terrace, Father and Shanthappan see her in a white dress and they both believe that there is a ghost. Then, Bhanu makes a new plan: to make everyone believe that there is actually a ghost and he will summon her with Ouija board in the presence of Father. When the Father performs some magical rituals, the Ghost (Lakshmi) will leave and that way she can get out of the hostel. They plan and do certain things so that the other inmates will believe that there is a ghost. But in reality, there was an actual ghost in the hostel who came when Bhanu used the Ouija board. Lakshmi successfully gets out of the hostel as per the original plan, even though some super natural events do occur. The ghost is shown still wandering through the hostel. The ghost then appears in the hallway and does a jumpscare

In the credits, Lakshmi is in her house and Bhanu visits her with her bag which she had forgotten in his room. She asks him if he had just come to give the bag or to say something else. Bhanu wanted to say that he loves her but Lakshmi already figured it out. She asks him to leave but hears her father's voice and asks him to wait until three in the morning. Bhanu now realizes that he is trapped in her house just like how she was trapped in the hostel.

Cast
 Dhyan Sreenivasan as Bhanu Prasad, Lakshmi's love interest
 Namitha Pramod as Adhishta Lakshmi, Bhanu's love interest 
 Mukesh as Father Alfred Kattuvillayil
 Aju Varghese as Bruno
 Neeraj Madhav as Remo
 Vineeth Mohan as Koshi
 Bijukuttan as Shaanthappan
 John Vijay as Gowndar, Adhista Lakshmi's father
 Sabumon Abdusamad as Veluchaami
 Devi Ajith as Adhishta Lakshmi's Mother
 Roshan Mathew as Premraj 
 Valsala Menon as Ammachi / Neighbour in deathbed
 Krishnan as Auto Driver
 Balaji Sarma as Electrician
 Disney James as Ammachi's son
 Anjali Aneesh as Upachana, Ammachi's daughter in-law
 John Varghese as Junior Student
 Thomas Pattathanam as New Admission Boy's father
 Bhagath Manuel as Harris (cameo)
 Pradeep Kottayam as Bhanu Prasad's relative (cameo)

Production
Filming commenced on 7 September at University Hostel Campus in Thiruvananthapuram. The title of the film Adi Kapyare Kootamani was revealed on 8 September 2015, Production Controller of Adi Kapyare Kootamani is handled by Shibu G Suseelan.

Music
The music was composed by Shaan Rahman.

Reception
The film collected  in 3 days of release, and subsequently grossed  in a week's time.

Abhilash S Nair and John Varghese were nominated for the Best Script of a Comedy Film category at 2nd Asianet Comedy Awards 2016

Sequel

In December 2015, producer Vijay Babu confirmed that there would be a sequel to the film, titled Adi Kapyare Kootamani 2. It would be directed by John Varghese.

Remake
In 2022, The film is remade in Tamil language named as Hostel. Starring Ashok Selvan and Priya Bhavani Shankar in lead roles.
It is being remade in Kannada as Abbabba

References

External links
 

2015 films
Films scored by Shaan Rahman
2010s Malayalam-language films
2015 comedy horror films
Films shot in Thiruvananthapuram
Indian comedy horror films
Malayalam films remade in other languages